Islam Anatolyevich Bidov (born 7 January 1987) is a former Russian professional football player.

Club career
He made his debut for PFC Spartak Nalchik on 22 June 2005 in a Russian Cup game against FC Fakel Voronezh. He made 3 appearances for Spartak in Russian Cup overall.

External links
 
 

1987 births
Living people
Russian footballers
Association football forwards
Association football midfielders
PFC Spartak Nalchik players
FC Sheksna Cherepovets players
FC Dynamo Stavropol players